Paykull, also spelled Paydkull, Paytkull, Paiküll, Paijkull, Pajkul or Paykel is a Swedish-Livonian/Estonian/Baltic German family name. It may refer to

 Göran Paijkull (1605–1657), Swedish soldier and riksråd
 Otto Arnold von Paykull (1662–1707), Livonian general and alchemist
 Gustaf von Paykull (1757–1826), Swedish Marshal of the Court, ornithologist and entomologist
 Wilhelm Paijkull (1836–1869), geologist, chemist
 Carl Wilhelm Paijkull
 Gunilla Paijkull

sv:Paykull